Ugly is the fifth studio album by Screaming Females, released on April 3, 2012, by Don Giovanni Records. The record was self produced by the band and engineered by Steve Albini in his studio Electrical Audio.  The group embarked on a national tour to support the album on April 7, 2012.

Track listing 
All songs written by Screaming Females (Jarrett Dougherty, Mike "King Mike" Abbate, Marissa Paternoster).
 "It All Means Nothing"
 "Rotten Apple"
 "Extinction"
 "Red Hand"
 "High"
 "Expire"
 "Crow's Nest"
 "Tell Me No"
 "Leave It All Up To Me"
 "Doom 84"
 "Help Me"
 "Something Ugly"
 "Slow Birth"
 "It's Nice"

Reception 

Todd Martens from the Los Angeles Times gave the album 3.5 stars out of four, saying that its "tracks unfurl like mini hard-rock suites". Tyler Kane of Paste Magazine declared himself a "fan" of lead singer Marissa Paternoster's voice, as well as her "meaty, ground-covering guitar playing". In his The A.V. Club review, Jason Heller called it a "grubby, triumphant call to action". Stereogum named Ugly their Album Of The Week saying "Itʼs almost not fair for an album to have this many great songs."  Pitchfork Media gave the album 8.0/10, writing that the album suggests the band may someday be worthy of writing about in a book such as Our Band Could Be Your Life.

The album was listed 21st on Stereogum's list of top 50 albums of 2012.

References 

Screaming Females albums
Don Giovanni Records albums
2012 albums